Gemma Amor is a British author of horror fiction, podcaster, and illustrator. She has written two collections of short stories, five novels, and edited a collection of stories. Amor co-wrote Calling Darkness and has contributed to other podcasts including The NoSleep Podcast and Shadows at the Door.

Career 
Amor's first experience of writing horror fiction for publication came through The NoSleep Podcast. She began listening to the show after it was mentioned on The Black Tapes and responded to a call for submissions. The first story she submitted to the show was "His Life's Work" which was released as part of season 10 in 2018. Later that year Amor released Cruel Works of Nature, a collection of short stories, some of which had appeared on The NoSleep Podcast.

In 2019, Amor published her debut novel, Dear Laura, and was a finalist for the Bram Stoker Awards in the category 'Superior Achievement in a First Novel'. It was written partly as a response to works where perpetrators of violence are the protagonists; instead Dear Laura told its narrative through the central character of Laura, someone who experienced trauma at the hands of an unknown letter writer over a period of years. The story was adapted into a multi-episode arc for The NoSleep Podcast.

Amor co-created horror comedy podcast Calling Darkness with Allison Brandt, S.H. Cooper, Desdymona Howard, Victoria Juan, and Charlotte Norup; Amor and Copper wrote the scripts. The first season was released in 2019 and Amor voiced the role of Gloria Smith.

In 2020, Amor, Laurel Hightower and Cynthia Pelayo edited We Are Wolves, a collection of short horror stories from authors such as S.H. Cooper, V. Castro, and Erin Al-Mehairi. The collection was released to raise funds for charities supporting survivors of abuse. In a review for Horrified Magazine, Ally Wilkes praised the collection's "quality and diversity of writing".

In 2022, Amor published the sci-fi horror novel Full Immersion with Angry Robot. The book follows the lead character, Magpie, during an experimental treatment to help with her post-partem depression. In a review for Grimdark Magazine, John Mauro praised Amor's "raw and honest description of postpartum depression".

Bibliography 

 Cruel Works of Nature (2018)
 Till the Score is Paid (2019), second edition released as These Wounds We Make
 Dear Laura (2019)
 Girl on Fire (2020)
 White Pines (2020)
 Six Rooms (2021)
 Full Immersion (2022)
 The Once Yellow House (2023)

References

External links 

 
 

Living people
British horror writers
British voice actresses
21st-century British writers
British podcasters
Year of birth missing (living people)